Flasher is an American indie rock band from Washington D.C.

History
Flasher began in 2016, with their history dating back to Emma Baker and Daniel Saperstein forming Sad Bones whilst still in high school, who released music digitally via Bandcamp. Taylor Mulitz met the duo at a show in 2007. Several years later, Mulitz and Baker formed Young Trynas and released an EP in 2015. The band originally featured bassist Eva Moolchan, who was replaced by Saperstein.

The trio released their self-titled EP Flasher on April 8, 2016 via Sister Polygon Records.

On June 8, 2018, Flasher released their debut studio album Constant Image via Domino Recording Company. Upon its release, the album was given "generally favorable" reviews by Metacritic. Commenting on the recording of the album, Mulitz stated that "“it was kind of traumatic, honestly. We had to go to therapy together" and Saperstein adding that upon returning home from the album sessions that the band "were reeling. We couldn't just pretend we could move forward. It wasn't that we were angry at each other, per se - we just had stuff we needed to work through".

On March 15, 2022, the band announced that their second album Love Is Yours would be released on June 17, 2022. They also revealed that singer and bassist Daniel Saperstein was no longer in the band.

Discography

Albums
 Constant Image (2018, Domino Recording Company)
 Love is Yours (2022, Domino Recording Company)

EPs
 Flasher (2016, Sister Polygon Records)

References

External links
 
 

Musical groups from Washington, D.C.
Musical groups established in 2016
2016 establishments in Washington, D.C.